Benjamin Saint-Huile (born 10 May 1983) is a French politician from the miscellaneous left. He was elected as the Member of Parliament for Nord's 3rd constituency in the 2022 French legislative election.

References

See also 

 List of deputies of the 16th National Assembly of France

1983 births
Living people
21st-century French politicians
Members of Parliament for Nord
Deputies of the 16th National Assembly of the French Fifth Republic
Socialist Party (France) politicians